Deniran is a surname. Notable people with the surname include:

 Ortega Deniran (born 1986), Nigerian footballer
 Victor Deniran (born 1990), Nigerian footballer, brother of Ortega

Surnames of Nigerian origin